Isabelle Peak is a peak located on the Continental Divide on the border of Banff and Kootenay National Parks in the Canadian Rockies.

Origin of the Name
The mountain was named in 1913 by R.D. McCaw, who made a phototopographic survey along the route of the Banff-Windermere road. The survey was made for the British Columbia government. The name "Isabelle" given by McCaw to one of his photographic stations at the request of Mr. W.W. Bell, engineer in charge of construction of the Banff-Windermere Road at the time. Bell had asked McCaw to name a mountain after his wife Isabelle.

Climbing
The Interprovincial Boundary Commission made the first ascent of the peak in 1913. A moderate/difficult scramble to the summit can be made on the southern slopes.

Climate

Based on the Köppen climate classification, the mountain is located in a subarctic climate zone with cold, snowy winters, and mild summers.

See also
 List of peaks on the British Columbia–Alberta border

References

External links
 
 Isabelle Peak on Fresh-Oxygen - route beta and photos

Two-thousanders of British Columbia
Two-thousanders of Alberta
Canadian Rockies
Great Divide of North America
Kootenay National Park
Mountains of Banff National Park